Morgan Downey is an Irish-born New York-based American commodities trader, and acknowledged authority on the financial aspects of the oil industry. His views about price fluctuations and trends in the oil market have been reported in numerous publications. He is the author of Oil 101.

Biography 
Downey was born in Ireland, studied finance at the University of Limerick, and moved to New York City after college.

His 2009 book Oil 101 Is an overall guide to the oil industry, with information about how oil prices are determined in global wholesale markets. According to The Wall Street Journal, the book covers the “technologies and systems related to oil exploration, production, refining, distribution and more.” Reviewer Robert Rapier described his book as detailed and comprehensive and a resource for persons wanting to understand the oil industry. 

In February 2014, Downey was appointed as the chief executive officer of financial data vendor Money.Net, described as a real-time market information platform for investors. Money.net filed for bankruptcy on 4/15/2021. Before Money.net, he was Global Head of Commodities at Bloomberg LP, where he managed the development and content of the Bloomberg Professional terminal as well as moderated panel discussions on industry topics. Before that, he spent 15 years as a commodity's trader for banks such as Standard Chartered Bank, Bank of America, and at Citibank In the US, UK, Australia, and Singapore.

References

Further reading

External links
Morgan Downey website

Living people
American economics writers
American male non-fiction writers
American non-fiction environmental writers
Sustainability advocates
American financial traders
American financial commentators
American businesspeople in the oil industry
Businesspeople in information technology
Irish emigrants to the United States
Year of birth missing (living people)